Kapyong is a 2011 Australian documentary film about the Battle of Kapyong, focusing on the part played by Australian troops. It was directed by Dennis K. Smith and narrated by John Waters.

It premiered on 24 April 2011, the 60th anniversary of the battle.
It was launched by then Prime Minister Julia Gillard.

References

External links
Kapyong at Oz Movies

Australian documentary films
2011 television films
2011 films
2011 documentary films
Korean War films
Military history of Australia during the Korean War
Films directed by Dennis K. Smith